The men's 100 metres event at the 1975 Summer Universiade was held at the Stadio Olimpico in Rome on 18 and 19 September.

Medalists

Results

Heats
Wind:Heat 1: ? m/s, Heat 2: +1.0 m/s, Heat 3: +0.6 m/s, Heat 4: ? m/s

Final
Wind: 0.0 m/s

References

Athletics at the 1975 Summer Universiade
1975